The Seoul Peace Prize was established in 1990 as a biennial recognition with monetary award to commemorate the success of the 24th Summer Olympic Games held in Seoul, South Korea, an event in which 160 nations from across the world took part, creating harmony and friendship. The Seoul Peace Prize was established to crystallize the wishes of the Korean people for peace in the Korean peninsula and the rest of the world. The nominating group, the Seoul Peace Prize Cultural Foundation, consists of 500 Korean nationals and 800 internationals. The awardee receives a diploma, a plaque and honorarium of US$200,000.

Past Seoul Peace Prize recipients have gone on to be nominated and awarded the Nobel Peace Prize, including Médecins Sans Frontières (1996 SPP, 1999 NPP) and Bangladeshi Dr. Muhammad Yunus (2006 SPP, 2006 NPP), the founder of Grameen Bank which pioneered the concept of microcredit for supporting innovators in multiple developing countries in Asia, Africa and Latin America, and also inspired programs such as the Infolady Social Entrepreneurship Programme of Dnet (A Social Enterprise).

Recipients

References

External links
Seoul Peace Prize website

Seoul
Peace awards
Awards established in 1990